Chemical is a house song by MK.

Production
The song was produced by MK and CamelPhat and features vocals from Kyle Miller. It was written by MK, Miller, Di Scala, and Whelan. The song was released in May 2021 on MK's own label Area10 and on Big On Blue Entertainment.

Video and promotion
The video was released in June 2021 and was directed by Aube Perrie. It features an anthropomorphic dog named D. The following month, an online game called Chemical Chase was released, with gameplay similar to that of Flappy Bird. Remixes of the single are used for the in-game soundtrack.

Remixes
Three official remixes have been released, by 220 Kid, LP Giobbi, and MK.

References

2021 songs
2021 singles
MK (DJ) songs
Songs written by Marc Kinchen
Songs written by Mike Di Scala